Jakob Bresemann (born 22 October 1976) is a former Danish professional football central defender,.

He was the vice-captain of Lyngby BK, behind Morten Petersen.

External links
Career statistics at Danmarks Radio

1976 births
Living people
Danish men's footballers
Hvidovre IF players
Herfølge Boldklub players
Vejle Boldklub players
Lyngby Boldklub players
Danish Superliga players
BK Skjold players

Association football defenders
Ishøj IF players